The 2014 Canadian Masters Curling Championships were held from March 31 to April 6 at the Coaldale Granite Curling Club in Coaldale, Alberta.

External links

Live Results: https://web.archive.org/web/20150106085426/http://www.canadianmasters2014.ca/

 
2014 in Canadian curling
2014 in Alberta
March 2014 sports events in Canada
April 2014 sports events in Canada
Curling in Alberta
Lethbridge County